San Isidro is a district of the Grecia canton, in the Alajuela province of Costa Rica.

Toponymy
It is named after Saint Isidore, a Catholic saint.

Geography 
San Isidro has an area of  km² and an elevation of  metres. It is located on the slopes of Poás Volcano.

Demographics 

For the 2011 census, San Isidro had a population of  inhabitants.

Transportation

Road transportation 
The district is covered by the following road routes:
 National Route 107
 National Route 120
 National Route 711

References 

Districts of Alajuela Province
Populated places in Alajuela Province